Patrick Dooley (14 January 1910 – 2 May 1982) was an Irish Fianna Fáil politician.

A native of Athy, County Kildare and a schoolteacher, he was a successful candidate at the 1954 general election. He was elected to Dáil Éireann as a Fianna Fáil Teachta Dála (TD) for the Kildare constituency at the 1957 general election. He was re-elected at the 1961 general election, but lost his seat at the 1965 general election. He was also an unsuccessful candidate at the 1973 general election.

Dooley was related to Kildare TD Thomas Harris and to the MP Matthew Harris.

References

1910 births
1982 deaths
Fianna Fáil TDs
Members of the 16th Dáil
Members of the 17th Dáil
Irish schoolteachers
Politicians from County Kildare